Place on Earth is a Danish trio consisting of Mille Katharina Hassenkam, Kathrine Ørnfelt and Andreas Falch Kruse. They became the winners of the eleventh season of the Danish version of the X Factor. They were put together at bootcamp by  Thomas Blachman.

Performances during X Factor

Discography

Singles
 "Young" (2018)
 "Square" (2018)

EPs
 Square (2018)

References

External links

Musical groups established in 2018
Danish musical groups
2018 establishments in Denmark